The Augustus J. Oakes House is a historic residence in Yazoo City, Mississippi. Augustus J. Oakes (March 22, 1854 - October 2, 1924) was the founder of the private Oakes Academy school for African Americans in 1884. He was married to Emma Johnson Oakes (1882 - 1942) and is buried in Yazoo City's Glenwood Cemetery. The house was added to the National Register of Historic Places on April 8, 1993. It is located at 308 Monroe Street.

The house is located at coordinates: 32°50′37″N 90°24′50″W / 32.843611°N 90.413889°W / 32.843611; -90.413889

See also
National Register of Historic Places listings in Yazoo County, Mississippi

References

Houses in Yazoo County, Mississippi
Colonial Revival architecture in Mississippi
Queen Anne architecture in Mississippi
Houses on the National Register of Historic Places in Mississippi
National Register of Historic Places in Yazoo County, Mississippi